Tomo Maesawa (Japanese: 前澤智, born 10 December 1987) is a retired Japanese mixed martial artist. A professional competitor since 2012, Maesawa is the former DEEP JEWELS Atomweight champion, having retired with the title after defending it twice.

At the time of her retirement, she was ranked as the #10 atomweight in the world by Fight Matrix and #9 by Sherdog.

Mixed martial arts career

Early career
Maesawa was scheduled to make her professional debut against Mika Nagano at Jewels - 21st Ring. Nagano won the fight by unanimous decision.

Maesawa was scheduled to face Kikuyo Ishikawa at Jewels - 22nd Ring. Ishikawa won the bout by unanimous decision.

Maesawa faced Mina Kurobe at Jewels - 23rd Ring, and lost by a first-round submission, extending her losing streak to three fights.

Maesawa was scheduled to fight Hyo Kyung Song  at Gladiator 64 - Sapporo. She earned the earned the first professional victory of her career by submitting Song in the first round.

Measawa earned her second professional win with a first-round knockout of Yasuko Mogi at DEEP 64.

DEEP JEWELS
Maesawa was scheduled to fight Brittany Decker at Deep Jewels 4. She won the fight by unanimous decision.

Maesawa was scheduled to face Cortney Casey at PXC 44: Calvo vs Kadestam. Casey won the fight by a first-round technical knockout.

Maesawa made her second DEEP JEWELS appearance against Yuko Oya Deep Jewels 6. She beat Oya by unanimous decision. She won her third fight with JEWELS as well, winning a unanimous decision against Yukiko Seki at Deep Jewels 7.

Maesawa traded wins and losses over her next five fights. She first lost to Satomi Takano at Deep Jewels 8 by unanimous decision, before notching a victory against Karei Date at Deep Jewels 12. This was followed by her second career loss to Mina Kurobe at Deep Jewels 13. At Deep Jewels 14, Maesawa submitted Emi Tomimatsu by a third-round rear naked choke. She lost to Satomi Takano at Deep Jewels 16 by a second-round technical knockout.

Maesawa was scheduled to fight Ye Ji Lee at Road FC 041. Maesawa won the fight by split decision. 

Maesawa was scheduled to fight Yuko Suzuki at DEEP 80 Impact. She won the fight by unanimous decision.

Maesawa fought a trilogy bout with Satomi Takano at Deep Jewels 18. Takano won the fight by unanimous decision, increasing her overall score against Measawa to 3-0.

Maesawa was scheduled to fight Yuko Saito at Deep Jewels 19. She won the fight by unanimous decision.

Maesawa was set to face Jeong Eun Park at Deep Jewels 21. She beat Park by unanimous decision.

DEEP JEWELS Atomweight champion
Maesawa challenged the reigning DEEP JEWELS Atomweight champion Mina Kurobe  at Deep Jewels 22. They had fought twice previously, with Kurobe winning both of their prior bouts. Maesawa won the fight by split decision, with two of the judges scoring the fight 29-28 and 30-27 in her favor, while the third judge scored it 29-28 for Kurobe.

Maesawa was scheduled to fight Kanna Asakura in a non-title bout at Deep Jewels 23. Asakura won the fight by unanimous decision, using her superior wrestling to dominate Maesawa.

Maesawa was scheduled to make her Rizin debut at Rizin 17, against Seo Hee Ham. Ham won the fight by a first-round technical knockout, stopping Maesawa through repeated knee strikes.

After losing two non-title bouts back-to-back, Maesawa was scheduled to make her first title defense against Emi Tomimatsu at Deep Jewels 26. Maesawa won the fight by unanimous decision, with scores of 30-27, 30-27 and 29-28.

Maesawa was scheduled to make her second appearance with Rizin at Rizin 22, when she was scheduled to fight Ayaka Hamasaki. Hamasaki won the fight by a second-round kimura submission.

Maesawa made her second title defense against Hikaru Aono at Deep Jewels 30. She submitted Aono with a front choke, 57 seconds into the third round. During her post-fight interview, Maesawa announced her retirement.

Championships and accomplishments
DEEP JEWELS
DEEP JEWELS Atomweight Championship
Two successful title defenses

Mixed martial arts record

 
|-
| Win
| align=center| 14–11
| Hikaru Aono
| Submission (front choke)
| Deep Jewels 30
| 
| align=center| 3
| align=center| 0:57
| Tokyo, Japan
|
|-
|Loss
|align=center|13–11
|Ayaka Hamasaki
|Submission (kimura)
|Rizin 22
|
|align=center|2
|align=center|1:26
|Yokohama, Japan
|
|-
| Win
| align=center| 13–10
| Emi Tomimatsu
| Decision (unanimous)
| Deep Jewels 26
| 
| align=center| 3
| align=center| 5:00
| Tokyo, Japan
|
|-
|Loss
|align=center|12–10
|Seo Hee Ham
|TKO (knees)
|Rizin 17
|
|align=center|1
|align=center|3:13
|Saitama, Japan
|
|-
| Loss
| align=center| 12–9
| Kanna Asakura
| Decision (unanimous)
| Deep Jewels 23
| 
| align=center| 3
| align=center| 5:00
| Tokyo, Japan
|
|-
| Win
| align=center| 12–8
| Mina Kurobe
| Decision (split)
| Deep Jewels 22
| 
| align=center| 3
| align=center| 5:00
| Tokyo, Japan
| Wins the DEEP JEWELS Atomweight Championship
|-
| Win
| align=center| 11–8
| Jeong Eun Park
| Decision (unanimous)
| Deep Jewels 21
| 
| align=center| 3
| align=center| 5:00
| Tokyo, Japan
| 
|-
| Win
| align=center| 10–8
| Yuko Saito
| Decision (unanimous)
| Deep Jewels 19
| 
| align=center| 2
| align=center| 5:00
| Tokyo, Japan
| 
|-
| Loss
| align=center| 9–8
| Satomi Takano
| Decision (unanimous)
| Deep Jewels 18
| 
| align=center| 3
| align=center| 5:00
| Tokyo, Japan
| 
|-
| Win
| align=center| 9–7
| Yuko Suzuki
| Decision (unanimous)
| DEEP 80 Impact
| 
| align=center| 2
| align=center| 5:00
| Tokyo, Japan
| 
|-
| Win
| align=center| 8–7
| Ye Ji Lee
| Decision (split)
| Road FC 041
| 
| align=center| 2
| align=center| 5:00
| Wonju, South Korea
| 
|-
| Loss
| align=center| 7–7
| Satomi Takano
| TKO (referee stoppage)
| Deep Jewels 16
| 
| align=center| 2
| align=center| 4:42
| Tokyo, Japan
| 
|-
| Win
| align=center| 7–6
| Emi Tomimatsu
| Submission (rear naked choke)
| Deep Jewels 14
| 
| align=center| 3
| align=center| 1:24
| Tokyo, Japan
| 
|-
| Loss
| align=center| 6–6
| Mina Kurobe
| Decision (unanimous)
| Deep Jewels 13
| 
| align=center| 3
| align=center| 5:00
| Tokyo, Japan
| 
|-
| Win
| align=center| 6–5
| Karei Date
| TKO (punches)
| Deep Jewels 12
| 
| align=center| 1
| align=center| 2:30
| Tokyo, Japan
| 
|-
| Loss
| align=center| 5–5
| Satomi Takano
| Decision (unanimous)
| Deep Jewels 8
| 
| align=center| 3
| align=center| 5:00
| Tokyo, Japan
| 
|-
| Win
| align=center| 5–4
| Yukiko Seki
| Decision (unanimous)
| Deep Jewels 7
| 
| align=center| 3
| align=center| 5:00
| Tokyo, Japan
| 
|-
| Win
| align=center| 4–4
| Yuko Oya
| Decision (unanimous)
| Deep Jewels 6
| 
| align=center| 3
| align=center| 5:00
| Tokyo, Japan
| 
|-
| Loss
| align=center| 3–4
| Cortney Casey
| TKO (corner stoppage)
| PXC 44: Calvo vs Kadestam
| 
| align=center| 1
| align=center| 0:39
| Mangilao, Guam
| 
|-
| Win
| align=center| 3–3
| Brittany Decker
| Decision (unanimous)
| Deep Jewels 4
| 
| align=center| 3
| align=center| 5:00
| Tokyo, Japan
| 
|-
| Win
| align=center| 2–3
| Yasuko Mogi
| KO (punch)
| DEEP 64 Impact
| 
| align=center| 1
| align=center| 2:19
| Tokyo, Japan
| 
|-
| Win
| align=center| 1–3
| Hyo Kyung Song
| Submission (armbar)
| Gladiator 64 - Sapporo
| 
| align=center| 1
| align=center| N/A
| Sapporo, Japan
| 
|-
| Loss
| align=center| 0–3
| Mina Kurobe
| Submission (rear-Naked Choke)
| Jewels - 23rd Ring
| 
| align=center| 1
| align=center| 1:49
| Tokyo, Japan
| 
|-
| Loss
| align=center| 0–2
| Kikuyo Ishikawa
| Decision (unanimous)
| Jewels - 22nd Ring
| 
| align=center| 2
| align=center| 5:00
| Tokyo, Japan
| 
|-
| Loss
| align=center| 0–1
| Mika Nagano
| Decision (unanimous)
| Jewels - 21st Ring
| 
| align=center| 2
| align=center| 3:37
| Tokyo, Japan
| 
|-

See also
 List of female mixed martial artists

References

External links
 
 
 

1987 births
Japanese female mixed martial artists
Japanese female judoka
Japanese practitioners of Brazilian jiu-jitsu
Female Brazilian jiu-jitsu practitioners
Living people
People from Hachinohe
Atomweight mixed martial artists
Mixed martial artists utilizing judo
Mixed martial artists utilizing Brazilian jiu-jitsu
21st-century Japanese women